Saint Denis may refer to:

People
 Saint Denis of Paris, 3rd-century Christian martyr and saint, patron saint of Paris
 Denis the Carthusian  (1402–1471)
 Brent St. Denis (born 1950), Canadian politician
 Frédéric St-Denis (born 1986), Canadian hockey player
 Janou Saint-Denis (1930–2000), Canadian poet and actress
 Jon St. Denis (born c. 1978), a Canadian curler
 Joseph St. Denis (1870–1966), Canadian politician
 Lise St-Denis (born 1940), Canadian politician
 Louis Juchereau de St. Denis (1676–1744), French-Canadian soldier and explorer 
 Richard St. Denis, American wheelchair charity founder 
 Ruth St. Denis, American dancer
 Yves St-Denis, Canadian politician

Places

Canada
 Saint-Denis (electoral district), in Quebec 1917–1997
 Saint Denis Street, in Montreal, Quebec
 Saint-Denis-De La Bouteillerie, Quebec, formerly called Saint-Denis
 Saint-Denis-sur-Richelieu, Quebec
 Saint-Denis-de-Brompton, Quebec
 St. Denis, Saskatchewan

France
 Saint-Denis, Seine-Saint-Denis
Arrondissement of Saint-Denis, Seine-Saint-Denis
 Rue Saint-Denis (Paris)
 Morey-Saint-Denis, in the Côte-d'Or department
 Clos Saint-Denis, an Appellation d'origine contrôlée and Grand Cru vineyard
 Saint-Denis, Aude, in the Aude department 
 Saint-Denis, Gard, in the Gard department
 Saint-Denis, Réunion, capital of the French overseas department of Réunion
 Saint-Denis-Catus, in the Lot department
 Saint-Denis-Combarnazat, in the Puy-de-Dôme department
 Saint-Denis-d'Aclon, in the Seine-Maritime department
 Saint-Denis-d'Anjou, in the Mayenne department
 Saint-Denis-d'Augerons, in the Eure department
 Saint-Denis-d'Authou, in the Eure-et-Loir department
 Saint-Denis-de-Cabanne, in the Loire department
 Saint-Denis-de-Gastines, in the Mayenne department
 Saint-Denis-de-Jouhet, in the Indre department
 Saint-Denis-de-l'Hôtel, in the Loiret department
 Saint-Denis-de-Mailloc, in the Calvados department
 Saint-Denis-de-Méré, in the Calvados department
 Saint-Denis-de-Palin, in the Cher department
 Saint-Denis-de-Pile, in the Gironde department
 Saint-Denis-des-Coudrais, in the Sarthe department
 Saint-Denis-des-Monts, in the Eure department
 Saint-Denis-des-Murs, in the Haute-Vienne department
 Saint-Denis-des-Puits, in the Eure-et-Loir department
 Saint-Denis-de-Vaux, in the Saône-et-Loire department
 Saint-Denis-de-Villenette, in the Orne department
 Saint-Denis-d'Oléron, in the Charente-Maritime department
 Saint-Denis-d'Orques, in the Sarthe department
 Saint-Denis-du-Béhélan, in the Eure department
 Saint-Denis-du-Maine, in the Mayenne department
 Saint-Denis-du-Payré, in the Vendée department
 Saint-Denis-du-Pin, in the Charente-Maritime department
 Saint-Denis-en-Bugey, in the Ain department
 Saint-Denis-en-Margeride, in the Lozère department
 Saint-Denis-en-Val, in the Loiret department
 Saint-Denis-la-Chevasse, in the Vendée department
 Saint-Denis-le-Ferment, in the Eure department
 Saint-Denis-le-Gast, in the Manche department
 Saint-Denis-lès-Bourg, in the Ain department
 Saint-Denis-lès-Martel, in the Lot department
 Saint-Denis-les-Ponts, in the Eure-et-Loir department
 Saint-Denis-lès-Rebais, in the Seine-et-Marne department
 Saint-Denis-lès-Sens, in the Yonne department
 Saint-Denis-le-Thiboult, in the Seine-Maritime department
 Saint-Denis-le-Vêtu, in the Manche department
 Saint-Denis-Maisoncelles, in the Calvados department
 Saint-Denis-sur-Coise, in the Loire department
 Saint-Denis-sur-Huisne, in the Orne department
 Saint-Denis-sur-Loire, in the Loir-et-Cher department
 Saint-Denis-sur-Ouanne, in the Yonne department
 Saint-Denis-sur-Sarthon, in the Orne department
 Saint-Denis-sur-Scie, in the Seine-Maritime department

Elsewhere
 Saint-Denis, Mons, Belgium
 Saint-Denis, Aosta Valley, Italy
 St. Denis, Maryland, United States
 St. Denis station

Other uses
, a ship, formerly SS Munich

See also
 
 
 Saint Dionysius (disambiguation)
 Denis (disambiguation)
 Saint Dennis (disambiguation)
 St. Denis' Church (disambiguation)
 St Denys Church (disambiguation)
 Montjoie Saint Denis!, the battle cry and motto of the Kingdom of France
 CFS Lac St. Denis, a former Canadian Forces Station in Quebec
 Théâtre Saint-Denis, in Montreal, Canada
 St Denys, a district of Southampton, England